Vikhar Manzil was a mansion of the Paigah nobleman and former Prime Minister of Hyderabad State, Sir Viqar-ul-Umra. He was amazed by the Hussain Sagar by its view of the lake, and thus bought this palace in Indo-European architectural style around 1900. He had been invited to its housewarming party.

Though Sir Vicar-ul-Umra did not live at this mansion, his son Nawab Vilayat Jung Wali-ud-Daula stayed here.

References

Heritage structures in Hyderabad, India
Hyderabad State
Palaces of Paigah of Hyderabad